The 1989–90 NHL season was the 73rd season of the National Hockey League. The Stanley Cup winners were the Edmonton Oilers, who won the best of seven series 4–1 against the Boston Bruins. The championship was the Oilers' fifth Stanley Cup in the past seven years.

Regular season

Until 2017, this was last time the Detroit Red Wings missed the Stanley Cup playoffs.

Sam St. Laurent of the Red Wings became the last goalie to wear a full fiberglass mask during an NHL game.

Final standings
Note: W = Wins, L = Losses, T = Ties, GF= Goals For, GA = Goals Against, Pts = Points, PIM = Penalties in minutes

Prince of Wales Conference

Clarence Campbell Conference

Playoffs

Playoff bracket

Stanley Cup Finals

The Edmonton Oilers defeated the Boston Bruins in the Final series, four games to one. For the Oilers, it was their fifth Cup win in seven years, and their only one without Wayne Gretzky (in fact, they defeated Gretzky's Kings in the second round). In game one, Petr Klima scored at 15:13 of the third overtime period to give the Oilers a 3–2 win. , this game remains the longest in Stanley Cup Finals history (Longest NHL overtime games), edging both Brett Hull's cup-winner in 1999 and Igor Larionov's game-winner in 2002 by less than 30 seconds. In game five at the Boston Garden on May 24, the Oilers won 4–1. Craig Simpson scored the game-winning goal.

Awards

All-Star teams

Player statistics

Scoring leaders

Note: GP = Games played; G = Goals; A = Assists; Pts = Points, PIM = Penalties in minutes, PPG = Powerplay Goals, SHG = Shorthanded Goals, GWG = Game Winning Goals

Sources: NHL, Quanthockey.com.

Leading goaltenders

GP = Games played; Min = Minutes played; W = Wins; L = Losses; T = Ties; SO = Shutouts; GAA = Goals against average; Sv% = Save percentage

Source: Quanthockey.com.

Coaches

Patrick Division
New Jersey Devils: Jim Schoenfeld and John Cunniff
New York Islanders: Al Arbour
New York Rangers: Roger Neilson
Philadelphia Flyers: Paul Holmgren
Pittsburgh Penguins: Gene Ubriaco and Craig Patrick
Washington Capitals: Bryan Murray and Terry Murray

Adams Division
Boston Bruins: Mike Milbury
Buffalo Sabres: Rick Dudley
Hartford Whalers: Rick Ley
Montreal Canadiens: Pat Burns
Quebec Nordiques: Michel Bergeron

Norris Division
Chicago Blackhawks: Mike Keenan
Detroit Red Wings: Jacques Demers
Minnesota North Stars: Pierre Page
St. Louis Blues: Brian Sutter
Toronto Maple Leafs: Doug Carpenter

Smythe Division
Calgary Flames: Terry Crisp
Edmonton Oilers: John Muckler
Los Angeles Kings: Tom Webster
Vancouver Canucks: Bob McCammon
Winnipeg Jets: Bob Murdoch

Milestones

This season would be the last the Toronto Maple Leafs would play under the 29 year ownership of Harold Ballard as a result of his death in April 1990 and the subsequent sale of the franchise.

Debuts
The following is a list of players of note who played their first NHL game in 1989–90 (listed with their first team, asterisk(*) marks debut in playoffs):
Wes Walz, Boston Bruins
Alexander Mogilny, Buffalo Sabres
Rob Ray, Buffalo Sabres
Donald Audette*, Buffalo Sabres
Sergei Makarov, Calgary Flames
Rob Blake, Los Angeles Kings
Helmut Balderis, Minnesota North Stars
Mike Modano, Minnesota North Stars
Andrew Cassels, Montreal Canadiens
Lyle Odelein, Montreal Canadiens
Vyacheslav Fetisov, New Jersey Devils
Alexei Kasatonov, New Jersey Devils
Murray Baron, Philadelphia Flyers
Curtis Joseph, St. Louis Blues
Tie Domi, Toronto Maple Leafs
Vladimir Krutov, Vancouver Canucks
Igor Larionov, Vancouver Canucks
Olaf Kolzig, Washington Capitals

Last games
The following is a list of players of note that played their last game in the NHL in 1989–90 (listed with their last team):
Reed Larson, Buffalo Sabres
Al Secord, Chicago Blackhawks
Bob Murray, Chicago Blackhawks
Duane Sutter, Chicago Blackhawks
Bernie Federko, Detroit Red Wings
Borje Salming, Detroit Red Wings
Reijo Ruotsalainen, Edmonton Oilers
Barry Beck, Los Angeles Kings
Helmut Balderis, Minnesota North Stars
Curt Fraser, Minnesota North Stars
Mark Johnson, New Jersey Devils
Ron Greschner, New York Rangers
Doug Smith, Pittsburgh Penguins
Vladimir Krutov, Vancouver Canucks
Paul Reinhart, Vancouver Canucks
Doug Wickenheiser, Washington Capitals

Trading deadline
Trading deadline: March 6, 1990.
March 6, 1990: Adrien Plavsic, St. Louis' first round pick in 1990 Entry Draft and second round pick in 1991 Entry Draft traded from St. Louis to Vancouver for Rich Sutter, Harold Snepsts and St. Louis' second round pick in 1990 Entry Draft (acquired previously).
March 6, 1990: Mike Gartner traded from Minnesota to NY Rangers for Ulf Dahlen, NY Rangers' fourth round pick in 1990 Entry Draft and future considerations.
March 6, 1990: Alain Chevrier traded from Chicago to Pittsburgh for future considerations.
March 6, 1990: Jack Capuano traded from NY Islanders to Vancouver for Jeff Rohlicek.
March 6, 1990: Jyrki Lumme traded from Montreal to Vancouver for St. Louis' second round pick in 1991 Entry Draft (acquired previously).
March 6, 1990: Jim Korn traded from New Jersey to Calgary for Calgary's fifth round pick in 1990 Entry Draft.
March 6, 1990: Peter Stastny traded from Quebec to New Jersey for Craig Wolanin and future considerations.
March 6, 1990: Jeff Sharples traded from Edmonton to New Jersey for Reijo Ruotsalainen.
March 6, 1990: Brian Wilks traded from Edmonton to Pittsburgh for future considerations.
March 6, 1990: The rights to Cam Brauer traded from Edmonton to Hartford for Marc Laforge.

See also
List of Stanley Cup champions
1989 NHL Entry Draft
41st National Hockey League All-Star Game
National Hockey League All-Star Game
NHL All-Rookie Team
1989 in sports
1990 in sports

References
 
 
 
 
Notes

External links
Hockey Database

 

 
1
1